2013 Indian Badminton League was the first season of Indian Badminton League started from 14 August 2013.

Teams
Six teams participate in the first edition of Indian Badminton League:

Mumbai Marathas
  Lee Chong Wei (Captain)
  Pranav Chopra
  Siki Reddy 
  Manu Attri
  P. C. Thulasi
  Sumeeth Reddy
  Rasika Raje
  Harsheel Dani
  Tine Baun
  Marc Zwiebler
  Vladimir Ivanov

Pune Pistons
  Ashwini Ponnappa (Captain)
  Saurabh Varma
  Anup Sridhar
  Sanave Thomas
  Arun Vishnu
  Rupesh Kumar K. T.
  Nguyen Tien Minh
  Juliane Schenk
  Joachim Fischer Nielsen
  Tan Wee Kiong

Banga Beats
  Parupalli Kashyap (Captain)
  Akshay Dewalkar
  Aparna Balan
  Arvind Bhat
  Aditya Prakash
  J. Meghana
  Daniel Farid
  Hu Yun
  Carsten Mogensen
  Tai Tzu-ying
  Carolina Marín

Hyderabad HotShots
  Saina Nehwal (Captain)
  Pradenya Gadre
  Tarun Kona
  Ajay Jayaram
  Kanthi Visalakshi P.
  Shubhankar Dey
  C. Rahul Yadav
  Taufik Hidayat
  Tanongsak
  Goh V Shem
  Lim Khim Wah

Delhi Smashers
  Jwala Gutta (Captain)
  H. S. Prannoy
  Sai Praneeth B.
  Arundhati Panthawane
  V. Diju
  Nichaon Jindapon
  Prajakta Sawant
  Tan Boon Heong
  Koo Kien Keat
  Wong Wing Ki

Awadhe Warriors
  P.V. Sindhu (Captain)
  Gurusai Datt
  K. Srikanth
  Ruthvika Shivani
  K. Maneesha
  Nanda Gopal
  Vinay Singh
  Sapsiree Taerattanachai
  Markis Kido
  Chong Wei Feng
  Mathias Boe

Venues
Six venues have been selected for the first edition of Indian Badminton League:

Standings

Schedule
The following is the schedule for 2013 Indian Badminton League.

League Matches
  represents designated home game for the club.

Delhi

Lucknow

Mumbai

Pune

Bangalore

Hyderabad

Knockout stage

References

Premier Badminton League
Indian Badminton League
Badminton League
Badminton tournaments in India